Larry Legault (born in Canada) has coached American football in France for several years. He has a leadership of the Thonon Black Panthers since 2005. Today, he is a technical director of the team  and is also the coach of France National Team.  He was previously head coach of the Aix-en-Provence Argonautes from 1990-1993.

High school and university career 

Before coming to Europe, Legault has coached in the AAA Cegep league where he coordinated at Vanier College and the Cégep du Vieux Montréal. From 1997 to 2003 he was the main coach at Bishop's University, Quebec, Canada. He also moved to Mount Allison University to be a defensive coordinator. in Sackville, New Brunswick, Canada.

References 

Year of birth missing (living people)
Living people
Canadian emigrants to France
Canadian sports coaches
American expatriate players of American football
American expatriate sportspeople in France